Temidayo Isaiah Oniosun is a Nigerian space scientist and businessperson. He is the founder of Space in Africa and the former regional coordinator for Space Generation Advisory Council for Africa.

In 2021, Oniosun was listed as one of Forbes Africa's 30 under 30 for his contributions to the space and satellite industry.

Early life and education
Oniosun was born in Okaka and grew up in Oyo, Nigeria where he had his primary and secondary education. He graduated with a bachelor of technology degree in meteorology from the Federal University of Technology, Akure in 2016 and has a master's degree in satellite applications from the University of Strathclyde Glasgow. He is currently a doctoral student at the University of Delaware.

Career
In May 2015, as a student of the Federal University of Technology, Akure, he led the University space club to launch a balloon to space in a contest. 

In 2016, he was the recipient of the International Astronautical Federation Emerging Space Leadership Award for his work in the space industry.

He was elected the regional coordinator for Africa for the Space Generation Advisory Council in February 2017 and re-elected for a second term in 2019.

Oniosun is a YouthMappers fellow where he led students to create and utilize open data and open source software for geographic information directly related to development objectives in unmapped places of the world where US Agency for International Development (USAID) works to end poverty. In 2017, he led a team to solve the problem of urban waste in Akure, Nigeria.

In 2018, he received the 35 under 35 space industry recognition award by the International Institute of Space Commerce (IISC). In the same year, Oniosun founded Space in Africa as a platform that covers business, technology, discoveries, events and political information on the African space and satellite industry. In April 2018, he was featured on BellaNaija's Under 25 series of young Nigerians under 25 who are influencing and disrupting the world of Entrepreneurship, Leadership, Governance and Corporate World.

Oniosun speaks at conferences across the world and regularly appears on various media calling for more government investment in space programs in Africa and leading conversations around the African Space and satellite Industry. He also comments regularly on the African space program on various media.

In 2018, he was a recipient of the International Astronautical Federation Emerging Space Leaders Grant Award and was listed in Newspace People 2018/2019 Global Ranking of the top 200 movers and shakers in Newspace.

In June 2019, he led Space in Africa in raising seed investment from AC Ventures from Florida.

In June 2020, he was selected as part of the inaugural Karman Fellowship programme. The fellows are considered to be change-makers and global leaders who are shaping the future of space. 

In July 2020, while speaking on Sunday Extra on Australian Broadcasting Corporation, he explained how African countries are looking to space to solve problems on the ground.

He is an advisor to Proudly Human, an initiative of which is the Off-World Project, a series of habitation experiments in Earth's most extreme environments. Oniosun has led several strategy and policy consulting projects for both government and commercial stakeholders. In 2021 led the African Union Commission baseline studies on the four-space segments and the socio-economic benefits for the establishment and operationalization of the African Space Agency.

References

External links

1994 births
Living people
21st-century Nigerian businesspeople
Nigerian company founders
Nigerian technology businesspeople
Yoruba businesspeople
People from Oyo State
Federal University of Technology Akure alumni